"Sweet Caroline" is a song written and performed by American singer Neil Diamond and released in May 1969 as a single with the title "Sweet Caroline (Good Times Never Seemed So Good)". It was arranged by Charles Calello, and recorded at American Sound Studio in Memphis, Tennessee.

Inspiration

Diamond has provided different explanations for the song's origins. In a 2007 interview, Diamond stated the inspiration for his song was John F. Kennedy's daughter, Caroline, who was eleven years old at the time it was released. Diamond sang the song for her at her 50th birthday celebration in 2007. On December 21, 2011, in an interview on CBS's The Early Show, Diamond said that a magazine cover photo of Caroline as a young child on a horse with her parents created an image in his mind, and the rest of the song came together about five years after seeing the picture. However, in 2014 Diamond said the song was about his then-wife Marcia, but he needed a three-syllable name to fit the melody. The song has proven to be enduringly popular and, as of November 2014, has sold over two million digital downloads in the United States.

Performance

The song reached No. 4 on the Billboard Hot 100 chart the week ending August 16, 1969, and was certified gold by the RIAA on August 18, 1969, for sales of one million singles. "Sweet Caroline" was also the first of fifty-eight entries on the US Easy Listening chart, peaking at No. 3.

In the autumn of 1969, Diamond performed "Sweet Caroline" on several television shows. It later reached No. 8 on the UK singles chart in March 1971.

In July 2021, "Sweet Caroline" re-entered the UK Singles Chart again 50 years after its first UK release, following its use by England supporters during Euro 2020. It re-entered the chart at No. 48 on the week ending 15 July and a week later it rose to No. 20.

Reception
Cash Box called the song "sensational," highlighting the fact that Diamond's "material and production sound take on a completely different dimension in this love ballad which maintains a warm glow throughout with occasional surges of strength."

Chart history

Weekly charts

Year-end charts

Certifications

Alternative versions
There are three distinct mixes of this song. In the original mono 45 mix, the orchestra and glockenspiel are more prominent than in the stereo version on the Brother Love's Travelling Salvation Show LP. The third version was a remix found only on the initial CD release of Diamond's His 12 Greatest Hits. This version has the orchestra mixed down and has the background vocals mixed up. It has a longer fade as well. A live version of the song is on his Hot August Night LP.

During the COVID-19 pandemic, Diamond changed some of the lyrics to "Hands ... washing hands ... don't touch me ... I won't touch you."

Use at sporting events

United States
The National Football League's Carolina Panthers have played the song as a victory song at all home games since 1996. In 2020, the Panthers played the song to an empty Bank of America Stadium in honor of all front-line workers in the COVID-19 pandemic.

The song has been played at Fenway Park, home of Major League Baseball's Boston Red Sox, since at least 1997, and in the middle of the eighth inning at every game since 2002. On opening night of the 2010 season at Fenway Park, the song was performed live by Diamond himself. Several days after the Boston Marathon bombing in April 2013, Neil Diamond led the crowd at Fenway Park in a rendition of the song.  Sales of the song surged nearly 600 percent in the week after the bombings, to 19,000 copies, up from 2,800 the week before. Diamond said that he would donate his royalties from those sales to the One Fund Boston charity to help the people affected by the bombings.

The Iowa State Cyclones have used "Sweet Caroline" as a football victory song since 2006.

Since 2008, the University of Pittsburgh has used "Sweet Caroline" as an unofficial school sing-along song by inserting "Let's Go Pitt!" over the instrumental three-beat "Ba Ba Ba" interval after the title refrain and replacing the repeated phrase "So good" with "Go Pitt!" The song started as a rallying anthem played between the third and fourth quarters of Pittsburgh Panthers football games, but has been adopted for use during other university sports contests, alumni events, and student ceremonies, including graduation commencement ceremonies, and references to the song have appeared on various school merchandise.

"Sweet Caroline" is sometimes part of the regular rotation of songs during sports events at other universities, and although noted as not as being a tradition specific to or uniquely associated with Pennsylvania State University, out of a speculated concern with the song's lyrics in the wake of the Penn State child sex abuse scandal, the university removed the song from the rotation of music played at football games prior to the 2012 season. However, performances resumed to loud renditions at Penn State football games in September 2013.

On February 22, 2020, newly crowned WBC and The Ring heavyweight world champion Tyson Fury sang the song live in the ring at the MGM Grand Garden Arena in Las Vegas to celebrate his knockout victory against Deontay Wilder following the conclusion of their rematch. Fury had also previously sang "Sweet Caroline" at a press conference ahead of his fight against Francesco Pianeta in 2018.

Canada 
The song is used at the Ontario Hockey League's Erie Otters home games, where fans replace the "bum, bum, bum" with "London sucks!" in reference to the rival London Knights.
The National Hockey League Vancouver Canucks regularly play this song at Rogers Arena, their home rink, during 3rd-period stoppages in play to energize the home crowd.

United Kingdom
Fans of the Northern Ireland national football team adopted the song as an anthem after it was played in the post-match stadium celebrations after defeating England in 2005. The song has been used at home games ever since. Northern Irish darts player Daryl Gurney began using the song as his walk-on song in 2015 for Professional Darts Corporation events, in tribute to the football team.

On June 29, 2021, at the Round of 16 of the UEFA Euro 2020 championships, after the England national football team won 2–0 against Germany, England supporters amongst the 40,000 spectators who were present at Wembley Stadium remained and sang the song after the match. The team manager, Gareth Southgate, remarked "So, to be able to send them home feeling as they do tonight, to hear them at the end ... I mean, you can't beat a bit of 'Sweet Caroline', can you? That's a belter, really." During post-match interviews, the team captain, Harry Kane, was visibly moved as he paused to listen to the singing crowd, remarking: "Yeah, it's special. I'm speechless, I don't know what to say." After their 2–1 semi-final win against Denmark, the England players led the crowd through a rendition of the song.

The song was subsequently adopted by the England women's football team on their run to victory in Euro 2022, being played in the stadiums after each game as England won; Chloe Kelly, who scored the winning goal in the final, was being interviewed pitch side after the win but ran off with the microphone when the song started playing to sing along with the team.

Reading started using the song as requested by the players in their first season in the Premiership for the 2006/07 season. According to former player Glenn Little, this was selected as part of a celebration of their record-winning 106-point Championship season. However, it was not until 2015, when Little suggested it should be re-established, that it became a fan favourite. The song was later adopted by supporters of Aston Villa during their Championship game against Stoke City in February 2019, as they battled from an early deficit to obtain a draw. After the game, Aston Villa had 12-game unbeaten run, which enabled them to reach the 2019 English Football League play-offs. Subsequently, they continued to sing the song after they won a pivotal penalty shootout at their cross-city rivals West Bromwich Albion, before eventually winning the play-offs and winning promotion to the Premier League for the 2019–20 season. The club players had later continued their strong association with the song, and sang the song within their dressing room, after a pivotal draw at their final match of the season, to narrowly escape relegation from the Premier League by only one point.

For cricket in England, the home crowd at Lord's, along with the players of the England cricket team, sang the song after their boundary count win at the Final of the 2019 Cricket World Cup.

The song was played in Arthur Ashe Stadium after British tennis player Emma Raducanu won the 2021 US Open Women's singles final.

On November 15, 2021, the Swiss national football team sang the song after a 4–0 win against Bulgaria in honor to the Northern Ireland national football team, who drew against the Italy national football team, thus permitting the Swiss to qualify directly to the 2022 FIFA World Cup.

The song is also played before the main event of Matchroom Sports boxing cards in the UK and sometimes overseas.

Mixed martial arts
UFC middleweight fighter Darren Till has adopted the song as his entrance music beginning at UFC Fight Night: Thompson vs. Till.

Personnel
Neil Diamond – vocals, acoustic guitar
Charles Calello – string, horn and vocal arrangements
The Memphis Boys – other instrumentation
Gene Chrisman – drums
Tommy Cogbill – bass guitar
Bobby Emmons – keyboards   
Reggie Young – electric guitar

Legacy
In 2019, "Sweet Caroline" was selected by the Library of Congress for preservation in the National Recording Registry for being "culturally, historically, or aesthetically significant".

DJ Ötzi version
Austrian singer DJ Ötzi released a version of the song in 2009 through UMG. His version reached number 19 on the German Singles Chart, staying for 18 weeks in the German charts. It also peaked at number 18 on the Austrian charts. The song was also included in the Hotel Engel (Gold Edition).

Track listing
CD-Single	
"Sweet Caroline" (Single Version) - 3:37	
"Sweet Caroline" (DJ Mix) - 3:46	
 		 	 
2009 Limited Edition - CD-Single 	
"Sweet Caroline" (Single Version) - 3:37	
Exclusives Bonus Video (Gerry Friedle: Mein Leben mit DJ Ötzi) - 19:04
 		 	 
2010 CD-Single 		
"Sweet Caroline" (Single Version) - 3:37	
"Sweet Caroline" (EURO 2010 Magic Moments Version) - 3:46

Charts

References

External links
 England vs Germany Euro 2020 at Wembley. Sweet Caroline after the final whistle
 
 Lyrics at Genius

1969 singles
1971 singles
2001 singles
Songs written by Neil Diamond
Baseball songs and chants
Neil Diamond songs
Checkmates, Ltd. songs
Bobby Womack songs
Andy Williams songs
Song recordings produced by Chips Moman
Irish Singles Chart number-one singles
Football songs and chants
Boston Red Sox
Carolina Panthers
Uni Records singles
MCA Records singles
1969 songs
United States National Recording Registry recordings
Song recordings produced by Tom Catalano